Syed Yousuf Al-Moosavi Al-Safavi (1904 – 29 August 1982) was a Kashmiri religious scholar and leader of Shia Muslims. He founded the influential Anjuman-e-Sharie organization.

Early life

Yousuf was born in Budgam in 1322 Hijri. He completed his education in Islamic law from Najaf in Iraq. He is a descendant of Mir Shamsuddin Araki, who came to Kashmir in the 13th century from the town of Arak in Markazi Province, Iran. After the death of his elder brother Aga Syed Ahmed Almosavi, he took over the responsibilities of the Aga family. He established an educational institution for Islamic learning called Madras-e Babul Ilem ("gateway of knowledge") in Budgam.  Madars-e Babul Ilem is the Alma mater of many in the Kashmir literary field.

It is the practice among Shias of Kashmir to go to their religious head (Mawlawi or Agas) for legal disputes instead of to government courts. Such Sharie Adalats ("religious courts") determine justice according to Islamic doctrine. During the period of Aga Yousef, Sharie Adalats became very popular. On a number of occasions the district court sent cases to Yousef's court. During the reign of Maharaja Gulab Singh, Pratab Singh, and Hari Singh, an article was included in the constitution of Kashmir which bestowed this Aga family with a unique honour. According to the article, if any one from the Aga family was required to give testimony in any case then he would not go to the court instead the court would come to his residence and record the testimony. No one from the Aga family should be summoned in the court. The law existed up to the period of Aga Syed Yousuf.

Career

Anjumane Sharie Shian
Aga Syed Yousef established Anjumane Sharie Shian in Jammu and Kashmir with both religious and political goals. Just as the government receives taxes from the general public, Anjuman Sharie Shian collects khums and fitr as alms from the Shia population to spend on social, educational and economic improvement for the poorer segment of the community. When Sheikh Abdullah's government passed the Land Reform Act, Aga Syed Yousef said the bill was against the doctrine of Shiaism, which resulted in the government exempting Shias from the bill.

Other accomplishments
Yousuf undertook the construction of Imambara Budgam. He widened the Imambara Hassanabad, a smaller replica of the one in Budgam.  Yousef also introduced the Shia nisab ("syllabus") at the University of Kashmir. He was the representative of Imam Khomeini

Personal life
Yousuf died on 29 August 1982. After his death, the district hospital of Budgam was named after him. Yousuf was buried in Budgam at the Aga Mehdi shrine. The shrine was constructed by Yousuf himself during his lifetime to honor Sarkar Aga Syed Mehdi, who was also Yousuf's grandfather. His son was Aga Syed Mohammad Fazlullah who died on 29 January 2018 in Budgam.

Succession

Aga Syed Yousuf died on 29 August 1982. He was the only patron and president of Anjumane Sharie Shian. Three renowned scholars of "Aga Family" claimed as his successor. Aga Syed Mustafa Moosavi, Aga Syed Mohammad Fazlullah Moosavi are considered three successors of Aga Syed Yousuf. Followers of Aga Syed Yousuf were divided into two factions: "Mustafai" followers of Aga Syed Mustafa Moosavi, "Muhammadi" followers of Aga Syed Mohammad Fazlullah Moosavi. After the deaths of Aga Syed Mustafa Moosavi and Aga Syed Mohammad Fazlullah Moosavi their factions are led by Aga Syed Hassan Budgami and Aga Syed Mohammad Hadi Moosavi respectively.

See also
Ayatullah Aga Syed Mustafa Moosavi
Hujjat Ul Islam Aga Syed Mohammad Fazlullah
Shaheed Aga Syed Mehdi
Mohammad Abbas Ansari
 Ghulam Rasool Noori
 Molvi Iftikhar Hussain Ansari
 Succession of Aga Family
 Aga Syed Mohsin Al Mosvi
 Tafazzul Husain Kashmiri
 Destruction of Kashmiri Shias

References

Notes

External links
  Budgam District official website cites 1955 extension of Imambara Budgam
 Aga Sahib laid to rest in Budgam, Daily Excelsior, 23 August 2002 cites 1982 death of Aga Syed Yusuf Al-Moosavi Al-Safavi
 

1904 births
1982 deaths
Indian Shia clerics
People from Jammu and Kashmir
Kashmiri people
Indian ayatollahs
People from Budgam district